Mahmutpasha Bazaar is a shopping street in Istanbul, Turkey.  It is located in the area between Grand Bazaar and Eminönü in the Mahmutpaşa neighbourhood of Fatih district. This market area, with copious small shops on both sides of the main street, is a symbol of cheap shopping in Istanbul. The bazaar hosts 256 shops.

History
The bazaar gets its name from the street, named after the nearby Mahmut Pasha Mosque: this was commissioned by the Ottoman Grand Vizier Mahmud Pasha (d. 1474) during the rule of Sultan Mehmed II in 1462.  The mosque complex also contains a hamam, a türbe, sebils and fountains.

See also
 Bazaar
 Bazaari
 List of shopping malls in Istanbul
 Market (place)
 Retail

External links

 Images from Mahmutpaşa Bazaar

Notes

Sources

Bazaars
Bazaars in Turkey
Fatih
Mahmutpasa Bazaar